Zoran Manaskov is a Macedonian former leader of the Frankfurt mafia. His nickname is Skršeniot (The Broken One). He was arrested in the police action "Dirigent" in 2010. For the heroin trade in Frankfurt and Vienna, he was sentenced to 13 years in prison along with his crime partner Spase.

See also
 Macedonian mafia

References

External links
 Oficial police video from Operation: Dirigent

Living people
People from Veles, North Macedonia
Macedonian gangsters
Year of birth missing (living people)